Colonnade Court is a historic apartment building at the northwest corner of Main Street and Hinman Avenue in Evanston, Illinois. The four-story building was built in 1928–29. The building's first floor is used as commercial space, while the other three floors house apartments. Like many of Evanston's apartment buildings, the building has a "U" shape with a central courtyard; however, the courtyard is on the second floor to separate it from the commercial space. Architects Thielbar & Fugard designed the building to imitate an Italian Renaissance villa. The building's design includes a colonnade concealing its courtyard from the street, arched entrances, and a bracketed cornice.

The building was added to the National Register of Historic Places on March 15, 1984.

References

Buildings and structures on the National Register of Historic Places in Cook County, Illinois
Residential buildings on the National Register of Historic Places in Illinois
Buildings and structures in Evanston, Illinois
Residential buildings completed in 1929
Renaissance Revival architecture in Illinois
Apartment buildings in Illinois